Crystal is a young adult novel by Walter Dean Myers. It was first published in 1987 and later republished by Amistad in 2002. The book focuses on Crystal Brown, a 16-year-old African American girl who is destined for stardom when she lands a contract with a modeling agency.

Summary
Crystal Brown has always been told that she is beautiful. She lives with her mother, Mrs. Brown, who is also beautiful, and her loving, but strict father. They live in the borough of Brooklyn in New York City. Crystal is at first elated when she lands a modeling contract with a fashion agency, because she likes to model and can possibly be famous. As the novel continues, Crystal realizes that the modeling business is not all it is cut out to be. Her friendship with her best friend, Pat, is suffering, her grades are slipping, and on top of all of that, Crystal feels her self-respect is at risk. She especially feels this way when her photographer, Jerry Goodwin, wants her to pose nude. Crystal starts to feel that the modeling business is just all about how she looks and not who she is. Soon, Crystal realizes she wants to quit. Her agent, Loretta, however, insists Crystal star in a movie that will ultimately boost her fame. Crystal refuses and after doing that and the death of a fellow model named Rowena, but later on Rowena try to kill herself. She cut herself and end up lying in the hospital. but then she gave up to live, so she died in the hospital, that makes Crystal quits. The novel ends by a man coming up to Crystal, who is shopping with Pat, giving her his card, and saying, "...Edward Abruzzi, Photographer...I think you could get into modeling...”

Main characters
Crystal Brown- The protagonist of this story. She is beautiful, but does not have very good grades. She cares, however, about her self-respect and life.
Pat- Crystal's best friend. She has better grades than her friend. As the novel progresses she becomes increasingly envious of Crystal's beauty because of all the advantages Crystal seems to receive at school and elsewhere.
Loretta- Crystal's agent who insists that Crystal star in a movie.
Jerry Goodwin- Crystal's photographer who although is kind to Crystal, insists that Crystal pose nude in order to make it in the modeling business.
Mrs. Brown- Crystal's mother. She is beautiful like her daughter. She encourages Crystal strongly to do well in modeling so she can have better opportunities then she did.
Mr. Brown- Crystal's father. He does not know much about modeling but is encouraging to whatever Crystal does.
Rowena- A fellow white model that Crystal meets. They eventually become friends. Rowena thinks that she is not beautiful, and near the end of the novel tries to kill herself. She is not successful, but a few days later dies at the hospital. Before she dies, she tells Crystal that her real name is rosa DeLea.
Joe Sidney- A famous man who is in charge of the movie Loretta wants Crystal to star in. Crystal feels uncomfortable when he "feels her up" the first time they meet.

Awards
National Book Award Finalist

References

External links
Harper Collins
Walter Dean Myers Website
Goodreads

1987 American novels
African-American young adult novels
Novels by Walter Dean Myers
Novels set in New York City